Broadway Square (also referred to as Broadway Square Mall) is a shopping mall located in Tyler, Texas.  The mall primarily serves the city of Tyler and the surrounding East Texas area. One of only two major malls in East Texas, the mall serves visitors from a large area. Anchor stores are Dillard's and JCPenney.

About the mall 

Broadway Square Mall was first opened in 1975 with Sears, JCPenney, Selber Brothers, and Dillard's stores as anchors. Since its construction, numerous changes have been made to the mall's design. In 1987, Dillard's purchased the Selber Brothers stores at both Broadway Square and Longview Mall, converting both to auxiliary stores. The former Selber Brothers store was later closed and converted to Old Navy. 

On October 4, 2018, it was announced that Sears would be closing as part of a plan to close 12 stores nationwide. The store closed in December 2018.

References

External links
https://www.simon.com/mall/broadway-square
https://business.simon.com/home/getstaticfile/188414

Buildings and structures in Tyler, Texas
Shopping malls established in 1975
Shopping malls in Texas
Simon Property Group
1975 establishments in Texas